The International Defence Exhibition & Conference, or IDEX, is a biennial arms and defence technology sales exhibition. The exhibition is the largest defence exhibition and conference in the Middle East and takes place in Abu Dhabi, United Arab Emirates.

History

The first edition of the exhibition took place in 1993. The exhibition is organized through the state-run Abu Dhabi National Exhibitions Company (ADNEC).

The business conducted at the 2005 IDEX totalled 2 billion US dollars. According to Stockholm International Peace Research Institute, the arms sales of the SIPRI Top 100 arms-producing and military services companies in 2017 (outside China) totalled at $398.2 billion.

As of 2010 well known exhibitors are Lockheed Martin, Airbus Group, Jobaria Defence, Isotrex, Streit Group, Oshkosh Corporation and Saab.

IDEX 2023 was held from 20 to 24 February 2023 with approximately 1300 exhibitors.

See also
 IDEF—Defence expo in Istanbul, Turkey
 IDEAS—Defence expo in Karachi, Pakistan
  Special Operations Forces Exhibition (SOFEX)—Defence expo in Amman, Jordan
 Eurosatory—Defence expo in Paris, France

References

External links

 
 Jane's IDEX 2011 show site at the Jane's Defence Weekly website
 2009 Review  at the Monocle website
 IDEX -2011 Press Release official IDEX website
 IDEX 2011—TheNational IDEX topic

Arms fairs
Events in Abu Dhabi
Military industry
Trade fairs in the United Arab Emirates